Xaveri Congo is a Catholic youth organization in the Democratic Republic of Congo. Xaveri Congo is part of the African Xaveri Movement and a member of the Catholic umbrella of youth organizations Fimcap.

History 
Xaveri Congo was founded in 1952/53 in Congo. The foundation of Xaveri Congo was also the beginning of the African Xaveri Movement that spread also to different other African countries like Burundi (Xaveri Burundi), Rwanda (Xaveri Rwanda) and South Africa (Xaveri South Africa). Unlike the scouts Xaveri considers itself an apostolic movement.

References

Catholic youth organizations
Youth organisations based in the Democratic Republic of the Congo
Fimcap
Catholic Church in the Democratic Republic of the Congo